The BRSABV Ekana Cricket Stadium is a cricket stadium in Lucknow, India. It is the home of Uttar Pradesh Cricket Team and is a Test, One Day International (ODI) and Twenty20 International (T20I) venue. The venue has a capacity of 50,000 spectators.
The ground has hosted many international and domestic cricket matches.

Test Centuries

There has been only one test century scored at the stadium till now.

ODI Centuries
The list of ODI centuries at the stadium.

T20I Centuries
The list of T20I centuries

Women's One Day Internationals 
Only one WODI century has been scored at the venue.

See also
 BRSABV Ekana Cricket Stadium

References

Indian cricket lists
Lists of international cricket centuries by ground
Cricket in Uttar Pradesh